Mitchell Lynn Garver (born January 15, 1991) is an American professional baseball catcher for the Texas Rangers of Major League Baseball (MLB). He previously played in MLB for the Minnesota Twins.

Early life 
Garver was born on January 15, 1991, in Albuquerque, New Mexico, to Gail and Jerry Garver. He attended La Cueva High School in Albuquerque, catching for the school baseball team. Garver was also known for his skill as a center back for the school soccer team, and his coach suggested that Garver move to the United Kingdom to further pursue his soccer career at a European academy. Garver, who preferred baseball, was "terrified" at the prospect and turned down the offer. As a junior in 2008, he helped the soccer team win a state championship and took the baseball team to state championship runners-up. When he graduated in 2009, Garver was named the Albuquerque Public Schools' Male Athlete of the Year. He batted .521 as a senior, including 10 home runs.

College career 
Garver played college baseball at the University of New Mexico. While at New Mexico, he played collegiate summer baseball for the Hyannis Harbor Hawks of the Cape Cod Baseball League in 2012, and was named a league all-star.

Professional career

Draft and minor leagues 
He was drafted by the Minnesota Twins in the ninth round of the 2013 Major League Baseball draft. He spent his first professional season with the Elizabethton Twins where he batted .243 in 56 games. He spent 2014 with the Cedar Rapids Kernels where he posted a .245 average with 16 home runs and 79 RBI, and 2015 with the Fort Myers Miracle where he batted .329 in 22 games. After the 2015 season he played in the Arizona Fall League. Garver spent 2016 with both the Chattanooga Lookouts and the Rochester Red Wings, where he posted a combined .270 batting average with 11 home runs and 66 RBI. He played in the Arizona Fall League after the season for the second consecutive year. The Twins added him to their 40-man roster after the season.

Minnesota Twins

2017 
In 2017, Garver was promoted from AAA to the MLB to play with the Twins. Garver debuted on August 19, 2017. He got his first major league hit the next day, and played in 23 games that year, batting .196 (9-for-46) with 3 RBI.

2018 
In 2018, Garver hit his first home run on April 5, and became the Twins’ primary catcher by May. He hit seven home runs and batted .268.

2019 
In the midst of Garver having a career year, on May 14, 2019, he suffered a left high ankle sprain after a collision at home plate with Angels DH Shohei Ohtani. Ohtani was tagged out at home, keeping the Twins 4–3 lead. Garver exited the game and was put on the 10-day IL, and teammate Miguel Sano was called up to make his 2019 debut. Garver enjoyed a breakout season despite only playing in 93 games for the Twins. In 311 at bats, he hit 31 home runs while driving in 67. Garver also won the Silver Slugger Award for catchers in the American League.

2020 
Due to injury, Garver was limited to 23 games in the shortened 2020 season. He batted .167/.247/.264 during the season.

2021 
On July 27, 2021, Garver became a part of major league history when both he and Detroit Tigers catcher Eric Haase hit grand slam home runs. It was the first time in MLB history that opposing catchers hit grand slams in the same game.

Texas Rangers
On March 12, 2022, Garver was traded to the Texas Rangers in exchange for Isiah Kiner-Falefa and Ronny Henríquez. Garver underwent surgery to repair a torn flexor tendon in his right forearm in July 2022 and missed the remainder of that season. Over 54 games for Texas in 2022, he hit just .207/.298/.404/.702 with 10 home runs and 24 RBI.

Player profile 
Garver is known for his unique catching stance, in which he keeps one knee on the ground at all times, in a manner similar to that of Tony Peña. In the early part of his major league career, Garver struggled with pitch framing, particularly in catching low strikes, and he worked with Bill Evers and Tanner Swanson after the 2018 season to find a stance that would improve his catching with lower pitches.

Personal life 
Garver met his wife Sarah during their sophomore year of high school. She received her veterinary medicine degree from Oregon State University shortly after Garver began playing in MLB. Their first child, a son, was born in July 2021.

References

External links

New Mexico Lobos bio

1991 births
Living people
Baseball players from Albuquerque, New Mexico
Major League Baseball catchers
Minnesota Twins players
Texas Rangers players
New Mexico Lobos baseball players
Hyannis Harbor Hawks players
Elizabethton Twins players
Cedar Rapids Kernels players
Fort Myers Miracle players
Scottsdale Scorpions players
Chattanooga Lookouts players
Rochester Red Wings players
Silver Slugger Award winners
Surprise Saguaros players
St. Paul Saints players
Frisco RoughRiders players
Round Rock Express players
St. Cloud River Bats players
La Cueva High School alumni